Urban Legend is a 1998 slasher film directed by Jamie Blanks, written by Silvio Horta, and starring Jared Leto, Alicia Witt, Rebecca Gayheart, Tara Reid, and Michael Rosenbaum, and is the first installment in the Urban Legend film series. Its plot focuses on a series of murders on the campus of a private New England university, all of which appear to be modeled after popular urban legends. In addition to its younger cast, the film features supporting performances from Robert Englund, Loretta Devine, John Neville, and Brad Dourif.

Filmed in Toronto in the spring of 1998, Urban Legend was released in the United States on September 25, 1998. It grossed $72.5 million worldwide on a budget of $14 million, and received generally negative reviews from critics, with chief criticisms being that the film was a blatant rip-off of Scream (1996). The film has been credited by both cinema and folklore scholars as being one of the first major films to redistribute the urban legends and folklore depicted within it to the public.

It was followed by two sequels: Urban Legends: Final Cut, which was released theatrically in 2000, and the direct-to-video film Urban Legends: Bloody Mary in 2005. In February 2020, a reboot of the film was announced to be in development, to be written and directed by Colin Minihan.

Plot
A killer decapitates Pendleton University student Michelle Mancini in the backseat of her car during a rainstorm. Meanwhile, at the campus coffee shop, student Parker Riley regales friends Natalie Simon and Brenda Bates by describing a massacre in the abandoned Stanley Hall dormitory, which journalism student Paul Gardner discredits as an urban legend. News of Michelle's murder spreads the following day, but Dean Adams and campus police officer Reese Wilson seem determined to bury the story. Damon Brooks, a jokester fraternity member, attempts to console the notably-disturbed Natalie, who rejects his sexual advances while in his parked car at a bluff. When Damon goes outside to urinate, an assailant in a hooded parka attacks him and hangs him from a tree. Natalie flees for help, but Damon's body and car have disappeared when she returns with Reese. Parker and his girlfriend Sasha Thomas assure Natalie that Damon has pranked her.

Later, while Natalie sleeps, the killer strangles her goth roommate Tosh Guaneri to death. She finds Tosh's body in the morning, along with a bloody message scrawled on the wall. Distraught, she tells Brenda that she and Michelle, her high school friend, had received probation for causing a fatal car accident after driving with their headlights turned off and pursuing the first driver who flashed them. Paul meanwhile investigates local urban legends, and discovers that the Stanley Hall massacre actually occurred, with William Wexler, a professor of American folklore, its sole survivor.

Dean Adams is murdered in the campus parking garage, and Reese later finds Wexler's office disorganized and covered in blood. Meanwhile, Natalie, Brenda, and Sasha attend a fraternity party coinciding with the massacre's 25th anniversary, during which the killer incapacities Parker in the bathroom and murders him by forcing pop rocks and bathroom chemicals down his throat. Sasha departs to host her late-night talkshow at the campus radio station. During the broadcast, the killer attacks her and her assistant, and her screams are played live on air; the fraternity partygoers assume it is a prank referencing the massacre, but Natalie, fearing Sasha is in danger, rushes to the station, where she witnesses the killer murder Sasha with an axe.

Natalie soon finds Paul and Brenda on campus. Paul, convinced of Wexler's complicity, escorts them away in his car. They stop at a gas station, and while Paul is inside, Natalie and Brenda find Wexler's mutilated body in the trunk. The two women flee through the woods back toward campus as Paul pursues them. They become separated, and Natalie flags down the university's janitor passing by in his truck. He picks her up, but the killer forces their car off the road, pursuing them in a separate vehicle. The crash kills the janitor, but Natalie leaves unscathed and flees on foot.

While passing Stanley Hall, Natalie hears Brenda's screams from inside. In the building, she finds her friend's corpses, along with an apparently dead Brenda outstretched on a bed; however, Brenda knocks Natalie unconscious moments later. When Natalie awakens, Brenda reveals herself as the killer, enacting revenge for her fiancé David Evans, the fatality in the road accident Natalie and Michelle caused. Brenda attempts to remove Natalie's kidney, but is thwarted when Reese arrives and holds Brenda at gunpoint. Brenda manages to stab Reese with a switchblade, and when Paul arrives, Natalie gains control of the gun and shoots Brenda, who falls out a window, before leaving with him to get help for Reese. As they drive away, the two discuss how this will later be an urban legend and all the facts will be misconstrued. Paul asks, "Well if this is an urban legend, where is the twist?" Brenda then appears in the back seat and attacks them with an axe. Paul crashes the car on a bridge, causing Brenda to go through the windshield and into the river below.

Later, a group of students at a different university have recounted the events of Brenda's killing spree, during which they say that her body was never discovered. Most of them disbelieve the tale, except for one young woman, revealed to be Brenda, who claims that the story was incorrectly told, and begins explaining "how the story really goes".

Cast

Urban legends depicted in the film
The film depicts various urban legends, some of which are featured as murder sequences and others that are merely referenced or discussed in passing.

Re-enacted
 Michelle is murdered by a killer in the backseat. This legend is also referenced by various people looking at the backseat or talking about it.
 Coverage of Michelle's murder in the university newspaper is covered up by the dean, referencing the "University cover-up of campus murder," and the subsequent fears of the students reference the "Hatchet man" legend, which has an unnamed killer targeting college campuses at random. The origins of the latter have been traced to serial killer Richard Speck.
 Brenda and Natalie attempt to invoke Bloody Mary at the entrance to Stanley Hall.
 Professor Wexler suggests eating Pop Rocks and drinking soda at the same time.  The death of Little Mikey from this is mentioned by Brenda. The killer later re-enacts this legend on Parker, substituting soda with cleaning chemicals.
 Damon is hanging from a tree while Natalie is waiting in the car below.
 Gangs driving with their headlights turned off, pursuing the first driver to flash them and running him off the road, is mentioned by Sasha in the library.  It is later revealed that Natalie and Michelle did this, killing a young man; it is subsequently re-enacted by the killer on Natalie and the janitor and finally revealed as central to the killer's motive.
 Natalie finds her roommate strangled to death in her bed with the note "Aren't you glad you didn't turn on the light?"
 The "ankle slasher under the car" legend is re-enacted on Dean Adams. 
 A guest at the fraternity party claims that the song "Love Rollercoaster" contains a real murder scream; meanwhile, Sasha screams for her life on air during her radio broadcast.
 Parker finds the remains of his dog in the microwave, resembling the "Old Lady dries wet dog in microwave" legend.
 The killer attempts to re-enact the "kidney heist" on Natalie.

Referenced
 A caller to Sasha's radio show states that she replaced her roommate's birth control pills with baby aspirin.
 A caller to Sasha's radio show asks about having her stomach pumped after performing oral sex and ingesting semen.
 A couple suffering from penis captivus call in to Sasha's radio show.
 Professor Wexler discusses the babysitter and the man upstairs legend during his lecture, and Brenda claims it happened in her hometown.
 Parker suggests placing spider eggs in Bubble Yum as the killer's next move.

Production

Development and writing
The concept for the film was developed by Silvio Horta, a recent film school graduate from New York University who was working at the perfume counter in a Nordstrom. Horta pitched the idea in late-1997 to Gina Mathews, a producer who was leading writers' workshops at the time. Mathews liked the story, and the two began further developing the concept before Horta drafted a screenplay. Producer Neal H. Moritz subsequently became involved, and agreed to co-produce with Mathews and Michael McDonnell. Horta and Mathews pitched the screenplay to numerous film studios, but none expressed interest in funding the project. In a last-ditch effort at getting the film made, Horta brought the screenplay to Phoenix Pictures, a then-new company who had only produced a small number of films. Mike Medavoy, an executive at Phoenix, was impressed by the concept, but Horta recalled that his screenplay "needed to be better," and re-writes began to take place in the late-fall of 1997.

In seeking a director, executive producer Brad Luff scouted potential filmmakers from Australia, and was impressed by then-26-year-old Jamie Blanks's short horror film, Silent Number, which he had made as his thesis film while attending film school in Melbourne. Blanks had initially wanted to direct producer Moritz's I Know What You Did Last Summer (1997), and went so far as directing a mock-trailer for the project, but Jim Gillespie had already been hired to direct it. Instead, Blanks was offered the screenplay to Urban Legend, and signed on as director in February 1998.

Pre-production
Jared Leto was cast in the role of Paul Gardner, the student journalist investigating the murders. Mathews recalled that he was cast based on a "dark" quality he possessed that was at odds with his conventional appeal, and because he was already an established actor, known for his role on the teen drama series My So-Called Life. Alicia Witt was cast as the female lead, Natalie, as the producers felt she was "against type" and also a strong actress, whose previous credits included David Lynch's Dune (1984) and the series Twin Peaks (1990). Witt said she was intrigued by the prospect of playing a survivor character who has to endure "extraordinary circumstance[s]."

Rebecca Gayheart auditioned for the role of Brenda, Natalie's friend who eventually unveils herself as the film's villain. Numerous actresses were interested in the role, and Gayheart recalled having to "go in and fight" for the part. She read for the role numerous times, and performed multiple screen tests before the producers settled on her for the part. The production chose to straighten Gayheart's hair, which is naturally curly, for the majority of the shoot, as they were concerned it may foreshadow her revelation as the villain. During the finale, however, her hair appears in its natural form.

Of the supporting cast, Joshua Jackson was granted the role of Damon, the joking fraternity member. At the time, Jackson had earned recognition for his featured role on the series Dawson's Creek. Michael Rosenbaum was cast as Parker, a friend of Damon; Rosenbaum was just beginning his film career, and had recently had a small role in Midnight in the Garden of Good and Evil (1997). Originally, a different actor had been considered for the role of Parker, but Blanks ultimately wanted Rosenbaum for the part. For the role of Sasha, Parker's girlfriend and the campus radio host, Tara Reid was cast.

Robert Englund, already well known for his portrayal of Freddy Krueger in the Nightmare on Elm Street film series, appears as Wexler, a psychology professor. Englund agreed to the part after being impressed by the concept of the screenplay, and was also a fan of several of the other cast members. Loretta Devine was cast as Reese, the witty campus police officer. Devine identified with the role based on her past experience as a dormitory director at Brandeis University, which provided her insight into "some of the goofy and dumb stuff they do." Danielle Harris, who had previously starred as Jamie Lloyd in Halloween 4 (1988) and Halloween 5 (1989), originally auditioned for the lead role of Natalie, but was instead cast as Tosh, her temperamental roommate.

In the role of Michelle Mancini, the ill-fated coed who is murdered in the opening scene, actress Natasha Gregson Wagner was cast. Wagner was drawn to the part as she felt it encompassed a "proper scene" that she could "sink [her] teeth into." Brad Dourif was given an uncredited cameo appearance as the gas station attendant who appears opposite Wagner in the opening sequence.

Filming

Principal photography began on April 20, 1998 in Toronto. The University of Toronto served as a stand-in for the fictional Pendleton University. The film's production design was completed by Charles William Breen, who had previously worked on such films as Blade Runner (1982).

The opening sequence was among the first to be filmed, as Blanks wanted to present a completed sequence to the producers early on to assure them of his directorial abilities. It was filmed on location at a gas station outside of Toronto; to achieve the effect of the storm, artificial rain machines were used. For the film's final sequence inside Stanley Hall, the screenplay called for a dilapidated locale. The production found a rundown building in Toronto that was scheduled to be demolished, and were granted permission to shoot there. As the sequence takes place entirely at night, the crew built a scaffolding out of pipe that was then draped in black tarping, giving the appearance of it being nighttime while inside the building. The interiors during this sequence were lit with candlelight, and cinematographer James Chressanthis drew inspiration from El Norte (1984), aspiring for a "ritual"-like appearance.
Additionally, aerial images from Trinity College School in Port Hope, were used for Pendleton campus.

Throughout the shoot, Blanks sought to keep on-screen violence "muted" or implied rather than shown in explicit detail. Several moments of violence written in the script were not filmed, among them a shot of Wagner's character's severed head rolling onto the road after her death. The death sequences in the film, however, required significant technical planning, with Sid Armour providing makeup effects. Reid performed her own stunts during her character's chase sequence, including the fall over the staircase landing, during which she was secured by a harness. According to Reid, the stuntman who performed the scene used a real ax throughout the filming of it.

Post-production
Post-production of the film took place in Los Angeles over a period of less than two months, beginning in July 1998 and to be completed for the film's September 25 release. During the post-production process, producer McDonnell returned to Toronto to complete pick-ups. A rough cut was pre-screened for a test audience in Pasadena during post-production, and the audience response was favorable.

Music
The film's score was composed by Christopher Young, who had previously scored several horror films, including The Dorm That Dripped Blood (1982), and Hellraiser (1987). Producer McDonnell had previously been in a band with Young in the 1970s in their home state of New Jersey. While Young admired the synthesizer scores of such films as Halloween (1978), Blanks insisted that he compose an orchestral score, which was more in alignment with Young's composing background.

There were two albums released from film, the original score by composer Christopher Young, and the original motion picture soundtrack.

Soundtrack 

Additional songs featured in the film:
 "Save Yourself" by Stabbing Westward
 "Zoot Suit Riot" by Cherry Poppin' Daddies
 "Total Eclipse of the Heart" by Bonnie Tyler
 "Comin' Back" by The Crystal Method
 "Spookshow Baby" by Rob Zombie
 "Crop Circle" by Monster Magnet
 "Love Rollercoaster" by  Ohio Players
 "I Don't Want to Wait" by Paula Cole
 "The End of Sugarman" by Roy Ayers
 "I Know God" by David Ivy

Release

Home media
Urban Legend was released on DVD by Columbia-TriStar Home Video on February 23, 1999. The release contained an audio commentary with director Blanks, writer Horta, and actor Michael Rosenbaum, as well as a making-of-featurette. The film received a region-free Blu-ray release on July 22, 2008 by Sony. Scream Factory released a 2-disc collector's edition Blu-ray of the film on November 20, 2018.

Reception

Box office
Urban Legend premiered at the Fox Village Theatre in Westwood Village, Los Angeles before being released theatrically in the United States on September 25, 1998. The film earned $10.5 million in its opening weekend (nearly recouping its $14 million budget), showing at 2,257 theaters across the United States. It would go on to gross $38 million domestically, and earn an additional $34 million internationally for a worldwide total of $72.5 million.

Critical response
On Rotten Tomatoes, the film has an approval rating of 24% based on 62 reviews, with an average rating of 4.40/10. The site's critics consensus reads: "Elements of Scream reappear in a vastly inferior vehicle." On Metacritic it has a weighted average score of 35 out of 100, based on 15 critics, indicating "generally unfavorable reviews". Audiences polled by CinemaScore gave the film an average grade of "C" on an A+ to F scale.
Many critics drew negative comparisons to Wes Craven's Scream, released two years prior.

Anita Gates of The New York Times called the film a "teen-age moviegoer's dream", adding: "It has familiar young television stars, familiar older stars with cult followings (Robert Englund as the aforementioned professor, John Neville as the dean), an edgy sense of humor, a tricky plot and characters too genre-savvy for their own good. Maybe there will be an oversaturation of Scream-inspired horror films someday soon, but this one feels fresh." Bob Heisler of the Los Angeles Times called it an unoriginal "low-voltage drive-in movie, made strictly by-the-book."

Roger Ebert of the Chicago Sun-Times awarded the film two out of four stars, but praised Christopher Young's musical score, and adding: "The film is competently made, and the attractive cast emotes and screams energetically, and does a good job of unwisely grabbing one another by the shoulders." Entertainment Weeklys Ty Burr wrote of the film: "Proficiently filmed and utterly uninspired, it at least features a ghostly lead performance by Cybills Alicia Witt and a final twist that's entertainingly stupid. But why do all the characters have to be such nasty little dorks? Oh, right, otherwise we'd care about them." Kim Newman of the British publication Sight & Sound wrote: "Urban Legend manages somehow to be rather endearing, from Natasha Gregson Wagner's opening bit (what must now, after Scream, be called 'the Drew Barrymore position') to the hokey shaggy-dog punchline."

Sequel

A sequel titled Urban Legends: Final Cut, was released in 2000.

Notes

References

Sources

External links

 
 

1998 films
1998 horror films
1990s serial killer films
1990s slasher films
1990s teen horror films
1998 directorial debut films
1990s English-language films
1990s American films
1990s Canadian films
American serial killer films
American slasher films
American teen horror films
Canadian slasher films
Films about bipolar disorder
Horror films based on urban legends
Films scored by Christopher Young
Films set in New Hampshire
Films set in universities and colleges
Films shot in Toronto
Films about mass murder
Films about organ trafficking
Original Film films
Phoenix Pictures films
TriStar Pictures films
American films about revenge
Films directed by Jamie Blanks
Urban Legend (film series)